The Hornberg Basin is the upper reservoir of the Wehr power station, whose lower reservoir is impounded by the Wehra Dam. It lies near Herrischried (Hornberg) and near the town of Wehr in the county of Waldshut in Baden-Württemberg on the dome of the Langer Eck, the highest hill in the Hotzenwald. It was opened in 1975, is only used to generate pumped-storage power and is operated by the Schluchseewerk.

An addition to the existing Hornberg Basin was planned as part of building the Atdorf Power Station, but the effort was cancelled in 2017 by the local operating company EnBW. With a length of almost one kilometre and storage capacity of 9 million m³ it would have been considerably larger than the present Hornberg Basin.

See also 
 List of dams in Germany

References

Literature 
Festschrift Hornbergstufe der Schluchseewerk AG. November 1976
Peter Franke, Wolfgang Frey: Talsperren in der Bundesrepublik Deutschland. DNK – DVWK 1987, .

Lakes of the Black Forest
Reservoirs in Baden-Württemberg
Dams in Baden-Württemberg
Waldshut (district)
Baden
1970s architecture
Hotzenwald
Schluchseewerk